The Volvo China Open was a men's golf tournament that was held annually in China since 1995 until 2021. The event was organised by the China Golf Association and was co-sanctioned by the European Tour from 2004 until 2019. It has also featured as part of the Asian Tour, the OneAsia Tour, the China Tour and the Asia Golf Circuit.

History
The first event was played in 1995 as the China Open and featured on the Asia Golf Circuit. Raúl Fretes was the inaugural champion. The following year the event moved to the Asian Tour's schedule and continued to through 2008. The event joined the European Tour in 2004. Stephen Dodd won the first edition on the European Tour.

Changes occurred in 2009 with the announcement of the OneAsia Tour, a new golf tour set up by the China Golf Association in partnership with the PGA Tour of Australasia, the Japan Golf Tour, the Korean PGA and the Korean Golf Association. Having been involved in the early stages, the Asian Tour withdrew from the OneAsia Tour. As a result, four events, the Volvo China Open, Pine Valley Beijing Open, Korea Open and Midea China Classic were removed from the schedule and subsequently became the founding events of the new tour. In addition, the Asian Tour stated that they would not allow their members to play in those events unless already qualified via membership of the European Tour, promising stiff penalties for those that ignored this ruling.

In 2011, Nicolas Colsaerts broke the tournament scoring record, shooting an aggregate of 264 (24 under par). He won by four shots.

Wu Ashun won the 2015 event by one shot over David Howell. He made history as he became the first Chinese player to win a European Tour event on home soil. Li Haotong won the event the following year, shooting a final-round 64 to win by three shots. He also became the second successive winner on home soil.

Due to the COVID-19 pandemic, the 2020 and 2021 events were not sanctioned by the European Tour and proceeded as sole-sanctioned China Tour events. Zhang Jin won the 2021 event by making birdie at the final hole to beat Li Haotong by one shot.

The 2022 event was scheduled to take place at the end of April on the European Tour, however it was postponed due to the COVID-19 pandemic. It was eventually not played at all in 2022 and was not scheduled on the 2023 European Tour season.

Venues
The following venues have been used since the founding of the Volvo China Open in 1995.

Winners

Notes

References

External links

Coverage on the European Tour's official site
Coverage on the Asian Tour's official site

Former European Tour events
Former Asian Tour events
Golf tournaments in China
Recurring sporting events established in 1995
1995 establishments in China